The Sussex Greensand Way is a Roman road that runs east-west linking the London to Lewes Way at Barcombe Mills to Stane Street at Hardham. The road, which has almost entirely fallen out of use, follows the free draining ridge of greensand which lies north of the South Downs. It is a planned route rather than a Romanised Iron Age track, following a few straight alignments without any steep gradients, which linked various north-south roads and tracks. A number of important Roman villas and their farming estates were linked by the road. It is not known at what time during the Roman period the road was built.

The route
Branching from the London to Eastbourne area Roman road at Barcombe Mills, north of Lewes  the road runs west through East Chiltington then passes the south side of Plumpton Racecourse (where the agger runs beside the tarmac entrance road for some 200 m) then on to Streat, a Saxon placename indicative of a Roman road. Passing north of Ditchling and through Keymer it crosses the London to Brighton Way Roman road at Hassocks, where there was a Roman cemetery. West of Hassocks the road turns a little to the south, passing through Bedlam Street south of Hurstpierpoint where it briefly runs on a prominent agger alongside and then crosses the B2117, and continues past Woodmancote to Woods Mill, with short sections under or adjacent to the Woods Mill to Woodmancote road. The road then runs across the River Adur floodplain, where the Adur was bridged on wooden piles close to Stretham Manor. From the river the road runs west to the moated Buncton Manor Farm where it turns north west to West Chiltington and crosses the River Arun floodplain to join Stane Street at Hardham  Remains of a Roman bath house have been found east of the junction and there was a posting station or Mansio on Stane Street at Hardham.

Purposes of the road

The road linked numerous villa estates along the greensand ridge and joined various north-south routes. There was a Roman temple at Chanctonbury Ring and a large cemetery has been found near a crossroads at Hassocks. The road is unlikely to have had any military importance in the early Roman period when the empire was at the zenith of its power and the Sussex area was a friendly client kingdom, but as Saxon and Jute raiding became a problem along the coasts the inland route may have become a safer alternative to the coastal roads. In the aftermath of Roman rule it took some fourteen years for Saxon settlers in the Chichester area to overcome Romano-British resistance based on the fortress of Anderitum at Pevensey. The road may have had military importance during this time.

Construction
Well preserved examples of the agger occur along the south side of Plumpton Racecourse and adjoining the B2117 road south of Hurstpierpoint.

References

See also
 Roman Britain
 Roman roads in Britain

Roman roads in England
Archaeological sites in East Sussex
Roads in East Sussex
Roads in West Sussex